Sipakapense may refer to:
 Sipakapense people, an ethnic subgroup of the Maya from Sipacapa, Guatemala
 Sipakapense language, spoken by those people